The 2019 National League 2, also known as the 2019 MPT Myanmar National League 2, is the 7th season of the MNL-2, the second division league for association football clubs since its founding in 2012. At the end of the 2018 MNL-2, Royal Thanlyin won the MNL-2 title. After 2018 MNL-2 finished, Royal Thanlyin and  Dagon FC promoted to 2019 Myanmar National League. Chin United will play again in 2019 MNL-2.

Clubs

Stadiums

(*) – not ready to play. MNL clubs that have not had their home stadia ready to host home matches currently use Aung San Stadium and Thuwunna Stadium in Yangon.

Personnel and sponsoring
Note: Flags indicate national team as has been defined under FIFA eligibility rules. Players may hold more than one non-FIFA nationality.

Result

League table

Matches

Fixtures and results of the 2019 National League 2 season.

Week 1

Week 2

Week 3

Week 4

Week 5

Week 6

Week 7

Week 8

Week 9

Week 10

Week 11

Week 12

Week 13

Week 14

Season statistics

Top scorers
As of 5 March 2019.

Clean sheets
As of 15 March 2019.

Hat-tricks

See also
 2019 Myanmar National League

References

External links
 Myanmar National League Official Website
 Myanmar National League Facebook Official Page

MNL-2 seasons
1
Myanmar